This is a list of curling clubs in Japan:

Clubs

Hokkaido Island 
 Loco Solare/Tokoro CC (a.k.a. LS Kitami)
  (see also Hokkaido Bank)

Aomori Prefecture 
  (closed in 2013)

Akita Prefecture 
 Akita University Curling Team

Nagano Prefecture 
  (Nonprofit organization)
  (see also Chubu Electric Power)

Yamanashi Prefecture 
  (see also Fujikyu)

National organizations

Prefecture-level organizations

See also 
 List of curling clubs

References

External links 
Loco Solare (in Japanese)
Bank Fortius (in Japanese)
SC Karuizawa Club (in Japanese)
Chubu Electric Power CC (in Japanese)
Japan Curling Association (in Japanese)
Hokkaido Curling Association (in Japanese)
Aomori Curling Association (in Japanese)
Nagano Curling Association (in Japanese)
Yamanashi Curling Association (in Japanese)

 
Japan
Curling